Ena Guevara Mora (born February 7, 1959 in Ica) is a retired female long-distance runner from Peru.

Career
She competed for her native country at the 1984 Summer Olympics in Los Angeles, California. There she ended up in 35th place in the women's marathon. Guevara set her personal best in the classic distance (2:41.48) in 1992, when she also competed at the 1992 Summer Olympics. She finished fifth in the marathon at the 1987 Pan American Games.

Achievements

References
 sports-reference

1959 births
Living people
Peruvian female long-distance runners
Pan American Games competitors for Peru
Athletes (track and field) at the 1987 Pan American Games
Olympic athletes of Peru
Athletes (track and field) at the 1984 Summer Olympics
Athletes (track and field) at the 1992 Summer Olympics
World Athletics Championships athletes for Peru
South American Games silver medalists for Peru
South American Games medalists in athletics
Competitors at the 1990 South American Games
20th-century Peruvian women
21st-century Peruvian women